Postcards is an Australian holiday and travel television series on the Nine Network.

History 
There were originally three different versions of Postcards, each produced and broadcast within its specific city or market. In 1995, Adelaide's Nine Network produced their first series. It promoted holiday spots within South Australia, encouraging viewers to travel within their state. Soon after, the Nine Network  in Melbourne launched their own state-based version and Nine Network in Perth followed in 1999 with Postcards WA.

In 2007, WIN Television purchased Nine Network in Adelaide and Perth. The Perth-based Postcards WA was then renamed Postcards Australia and expanded to cover more parts of the country, using reporters positioned across the WIN network, and in 2011 they axed the original Adelaide-based Postcards SA.

In March 2016, Postcards moved to a new Friday night timeslot and one hour format for Perth, Adelaide, Melbourne markets. Rebecca Judd hosted the show alongside presenters Livinia Nixon, Lauren Phillips, Brodie Harper, Shane Crawford, Glen Moriarty, Scherri-Lee Biggs, Warren Tredrea and celebrity chef Shane Delia.

Postcards Victoria 
Postcards Victoria airs on Sundays at 5.30pm on the Nine Network across Victoria and is currently hosted by Livinia Nixon.

Presenters 

 Brodie Harper
 Shane Delia
Livinia Nixon
 Madeline Slattery
 Sam Groth 
 Todd Woodbridge

The show has previously been hosted by Shane Crawford, Rebecca Judd, Giaan Rooney, Bridget McIntyre, Suzie Wilks and Geoff "Coxy" Cox.

Previous series

Postcards 
Postcards was produced by the Nine Network in Melbourne and was hosted by Rebecca Judd along with presenters Livinia Nixon, Lauren Phillips, Brodie Harper, Shane Crawford, Glen Moriarty, Scherri-Lee Biggs, Warren Tredrea and celebrity chef Shane Delia. The show aired in Perth, Adelaide and Melbourne market on Friday nights at 7.30pm.

Postcards Australia 
Postcards Australia was produced by WIN Television and WIN Digital Media and showcase exciting, engaging and beautiful destinations around Australia and recently New Zealand, highlighting the stunning locations, unique characters and interesting things to do, along with travel tips, local advice and much fun. Hosted by Scott McRae, series two will be seen across Australia and is also seen on Discovery Travel Channel in South East Asia, Korea, China and New Zealand.

Postcards South Australia 
Postcards South Australia was produced by Nine Network in Adelaide and was shown every Sunday at 5:30 pm from 1995 to 2011 hosted by Keith Conlon. Other reporters included Lisa McAskill, Ali Carle, Michael Keelan, Chad Cornes, Mark Bickley and Kym Dillon. The series ended abruptly on 20 November 2011.

Postcards Western Australia 
Postcards WA was produced by the Nine Network in Perth. It was first launched in April 1998 and was hosted by Philippa O'Connell who was joined by co-host Paul Entwistle in 2003. Reporters for the show included Ryan Campbell, Teresa Spiniello, Craig James and Fiona Argyle. In 2009, a brief series of Postcards WA was broadcast with host Angela Tsun. Soon after, the series expanded and was renamed Postcards Australia.

See also

 List of longest-running Australian television series
 List of Australian television series
 List of Nine Network programs

References

External links

Australian non-fiction television series
Nine Network original programming
Tourism in Australia
1995 Australian television series debuts
2000s Australian television series
2010s Australian television series
Television shows set in Adelaide
Television shows set in Melbourne
Australian travel television series